Mesta Peak is a conspicuous, sharp and narrow rocky peak extending 500 m in east-west direction and rising to approximately 400 m in Delchev Ridge, Tangra Mountains, eastern Livingston Island in the South Shetland Islands, Antarctica.  The peak has steep and ice-free slopes and surmounts the east extremity of Sopot Ice Piedmont to the north.

The peak is named after the Mesta River in Bulgaria.

Location

Maps
 L.L. Ivanov et al. Antarctica: Livingston Island and Greenwich Island, South Shetland Islands. Scale 1:100000 topographic map. Sofia: Antarctic Place-names Commission of Bulgaria, 2005.
 L.L. Ivanov. Antarctica: Livingston Island and Greenwich, Robert, Snow and Smith Islands. Scale 1:120000 topographic map.  Troyan: Manfred Wörner Foundation, 2009.  
 Antarctic Digital Database (ADD). Scale 1:250000 topographic map of Antarctica. Scientific Committee on Antarctic Research (SCAR). Since 1993, regularly upgraded and updated.
 L.L. Ivanov. Antarctica: Livingston Island and Smith Island. Scale 1:100000 topographic map. Manfred Wörner Foundation, 2017.

External links
 Mesta Peak. SCAR Composite Antarctic Gazetteer
 Bulgarian Antarctic Gazetteer. Antarctic Place-names Commission. (details in Bulgarian, basic data in English)

External links
 Mesta Peak. Copernix satellite image

Tangra Mountains